Cola octoloboides is a species of flowering plant in the family Malvaceae. It is found only in Kenya. It is currently threatened by habitat loss.

References

octoloboides
Endemic flora of Kenya
Endangered flora of Africa
Taxonomy articles created by Polbot